Willis's antbird (Cercomacroides laeta), also known as the laeta antbird, is a species of bird in the family Thamnophilidae. It is endemic to Brazil. It was formerly considered a subspecies of dusky antbird.

Its natural habitats are subtropical or tropical moist lowland forests and heavily degraded former forest.

Willis's antbird was described by the American ornithologist W. E. Clyde Todd in 1920 as a subspecies of the dusky antbird and given the trinomial name Cercomacra tyrannina laeta. A 1997 study found that Willis's antbird differed from the dusky antbird in both plumage and voice and as a result, Willis's antbird was promoted to species status. The common name commemorates the American ornithologist Edwin O'Neill Willis. A molecular phylogenetic study published in 2014 found that Cercomacra was polyphyletic. The genus was split to create two monophyletic genera and six species including Willis's antbird were moved to the newly erected genus Cercomacroides.

References

Willis's antbird
Birds of the Brazilian Amazon
Birds of Brazil
Endemic birds of Brazil
Willis's antbird
Willis's antbird
Taxonomy articles created by Polbot